Randi Skylvsdóttir Wardum (born 22 November 1986) is a Faroese former football goalkeeper who last played for KÍ Klaksvík in the Faroese 1. deild kvinnur. From 2004 to 2014 she represented the Faroe Islands women's national football team at senior international level. In addition to football, Wardum played handball for Kyndil.

Club career

In April 2008 Wardum signed for Icelandic Úrvalsdeild champions Valur. She became the first female footballer from the Faroe Islands to play for a foreign club. In September 2008 she was in the Valur team who retained their title with an 8–0 win over Stjarnan.

Wardum made 27 appearances for KÍ in the UEFA Women's Champions League, formerly known as the UEFA Women's Cup.

International career

The Faroe Islands Football Association (FSF) relaunched their senior women's national team in 2004 after an eight-year hiatus. Wardum kept goal in their first match, a 2–1 friendly defeat to Ireland. The match was staged in Klaksvík on 12 October 2004, the day before the nations' senior men's teams met at Lansdowne Road, Dublin.

She played in all five games as the Faroe Islands won the football tournament at the 2005 Island Games in Shetland.

In 2012, Wardum and her KÍ teammates Malena Josephsen and Rannvá B. Andreasen simultaneously became the first Faroese women to win 25 caps.

Handball
Wardum is also an accomplished handballer. She played, outfield, for Kyndil and was part of the Faroe Islands women's national handball team.

References

External links
 Randi S. Wardum at Faroesoccer.com
 Randi S. Wardum at UEFA.com
 Randi S. Wardum at Kvinnufotbolt.com

1986 births
Living people
People from Tórshavn
Faroese women's footballers
Faroese female handball players
Faroe Islands women's international footballers
Faroese expatriate footballers
Expatriate footballers in Iceland
Women's association football goalkeepers